Hypsimetopodidae is a family of crustaceans belonging to the order isopods.

Genera:
 Hyperoedesipus Nicholls and Milner, 1923	 
 Nichollsia Chopra and Tiwari, 1950
 Phreatoicoides Sayce, 1900
 Pilbarophreatoicus Knott and Halse, 1999

References

Isopoda